The Third Album is the third studio album by American actor, singer and songwriter Paul Jabara. The album includes the single releases "Disco Wedding" and "Never Lose Your Sense of Humor". The Third Album, whose title and cover picture paraphrases the Barbra Streisand album of the same name, was released in 1979 on the Casablanca Records label, and again features guest vocalist Donna Summer. In 1979 Jabara also composed the Streisand & Summer duet "No More Tears (Enough Is Enough)".

The Third Album was released on CD by Gold Legion on June 3, 2010, and manufactured by Universal Music Special Markets.

Track listing
Side one
 Medley: "Disco Wedding"/"Honeymoon (In Puerto Rico)"/"Disco Divorce" - 14:01

Side two
 "Foggy Day" / "Never Lose Your Sense of Humor" (duet with Donna Summer) 9:46
 "Just You and Me" 5:08

Personnel
Greg Mathieson – arrangements, conductor, keyboards
Brenda Russell, Brooklyn Dreams, Bruce Roberts, Julie Tillman Waters, Maxine Waters, Michelle Aller, Pat Ma Cloud, Pattie Brooks, Petsye Powell, Roberta Margarita Estes – backing vocals
Scott Edwards – bass
Sid Sharp – concertmaster 
Ed Greene (tracks: A1.1, A1.3, B1.2, B2), John Ferraro – drums
Jay Graydon, Paul Jackson, Jr. (tracks: A1.1, A1.3, B1.2, B2), Tim May – guitar
Gayle Levant – harp
Paulinho Da Costa, Victor Feldman – percussion
Gary Herbig, Larry Williams – saxophone
Chuck Findley, Denny Christianson – trumpet
Bob Stone – engineer, mixing

Notes
Mixed at Larrabee Sound
Mastered at Kendon Recorders

References

External links
 https://www.discogs.com/Paul-Jabara-The-Third-Album/release/943707

Paul Jabara albums
1979 albums
Casablanca Records albums